Mount Hebron Cemetery is a cemetery in Montclair, in Essex County, New Jersey, United States. Founded in February 1863 by citizens of Cranetown and Speertown (now Montclair and Upper Montclair), the Mount Hebron Cemetery features 30 acres of landscaped grounds. There are numerous entombment areas including a vintage receiving vault that is no longer in use. The Chime Tower near the main entrance can be used at any service to provide appropriate mood.

Notable interments

 Shirley Booth (1898–1992), Academy Award-winning actress for the film Come Back, Little Sheba

 Allen B. Du Mont (1901–1965), scientist and inventor best known for improvements to the cathode ray tube in 1931 for use in television receivers, manufacture of the first commercially successful electronic televisions and founder of the first licensed TV network, DuMont Television Network
 Olympia Dukakis (1931–2021), actress
 Edward Sylvester Ellis (1840–1916), author
 Bayard Hilton Faulkner (1894–1983), mayor of Montclair
 Albert W. Hawkes (1878–1971), US Senator from New Jersey from 1943–1949
 Herman Hupfeld (1894–1951), songwriter whose most notable composition was "As Time Goes By" in the film Casablanca
 Charles Henry Ingersoll (1865–1948), Ingersoll Watch Company co-founder
 Vincent La Selva (1929–2017), conductor
 Reggie Lucas (1953–2018), musician, songwriter, record producer

 John Raleigh Mott (1865-1955), Nobel Peace Price winner (cenotaph)
 William Staub (1915–2012), inventor and developer
 Louis Zorich (1924–2018), actor

References

External links
 
 

Montclair, New Jersey
Upper Montclair, New Jersey
Cemeteries in Essex County, New Jersey